Thomas Cherry (1873 – after 1898) was a Scottish professional footballer who played as a wing half.

References

1873 births
Scottish footballers
Association football wing halves
Motherwell F.C. players
Hamilton Academical F.C. players
Grimsby Town F.C. players
English Football League players
Year of death missing